hprints (pronounced in English as aitch prints) is an archive for electronic preprints of academic papers in the fields of arts and humanities. It can be accessed freely via the Internet since it is an open access repository aiming at making scholarly documents publicly available to the widest possible audience.

The hprints project
The aim of hprints is to make Nordic research available through an open access online electronic full text archive, but the limitation to Nordic countries is claimed to be mainly an initial restriction for funding reasons. The archive will primarily contain electronic research documents in the form of preprints, reprints, working papers, book chapters, conference reports, invited lecture manuscripts etc. The archive is set up, maintained and promoted by Copenhagen University Library and consortium members. The consortium original members were:
 Copenhagen University Library, part of the Danish Royal Library)
 The Faculty of Humanities, at Copenhagen University
 Lund University Library
 Museum Tusculanum Press, an academic publisher
 University of Oslo Library
Submissions of electronic text material to the archive is decentral and take place at the local individual researcher, or research group level.

Using hprints
Hence hprints is a tool for scientific communication between academic scholars, who can upload full-text research material such as articles, papers, conference papers, book chapters etc. The content of the deposited material should be comparable to that of a scientific paper that a scholar would consider suitable for publication in for example a peer reviewed scientific journal.

It is possible to search and find the paper by defined topics through an Internet search. Secondly, all submitted papers are stored permanently and receive a stable web address, as for example the paper in this example:

 Pietism and the politics of catechisms
 Horstbøll H.
 Scandinavian Journal of History 29, 2 (2004) p. 143-160
 http://www.hprints.org/hprints-00254947/en/

History
May 2007 the Nordic funding agency for libraries, Nordbib, granted the hprints project 287,000 DKK as part of its financing programme Work Package 2: Focus area on Content and Accessibility. The plan was to launch an archive one year from this date i.e. approximately June 2008: The hprints project wishes to provide a policy and a technical infrastructure that permits open access to research within the arts and humanities. The assumption was that this will result in a number of advantages with respect to the electronic accessibility and visibility of the arts and humanities research area.

October 2007, the Advisory Board of the Nordbib "hprints project" chose the system to be used for the Nordic arts and humanities e-print archive. Three possible alternatives existed: EPrints from the University of Southampton, LUR from Lund University Libraries, and HAL from the French national research council (CNRS). Both EPrints and LUR are free open source software that can be set up locally  or hosted commercially, while HAL is a functioning archive, to which portals can be set up.

At the hprints Advisory Board meeting in October, it was decided to collaborate with the French research council, Centre National de la Recherche Scientifique (CNRS). Hence, the hprints e-print archive for Nordic arts and humanities is set up as a Nordic HAL portal with its own layout and adapted to the requirements of hprints.

March 2008 hprints opened for public access. Since the archive is a part of HAL and  papers will be shared with the French national archive.

See also
 arXiv
 List of academic databases and search engines
 List of preprint repositories
 H-net
 Open access (publishing)
 Public Library of Science

External links
 
 

Eprint archives
Humanities
Open-access archives
Electronic mailing lists
Geographic region-oriented digital libraries
Norwegian digital libraries